The Phoenix Park Tunnel is a railway tunnel in Dublin, Ireland. The tunnel was built in 1877 and begins at the Liffey Railway Bridge near Heuston Station, running underneath the Phoenix Park for 690 metres before re-emerging close to the junction of the Infirmary Road and North Circular Road. It joins with the Sligo line near Glasnevin, before continuing to Dublin Connolly.

The tunnel was originally built by the Great Southern and Western Railway company to connect Kingsbridge station to the Dublin Docklands, and primarily used for freight. Historically the line had not been used for regular passenger trains, with most traffic through the tunnel being freight or carriages and engines shunted between Connolly and Heuston for maintenance. It had occasionally been used for special passenger services, including traffic for major Gaelic Athletic Association fixtures.

It reopened on 21 November 2016 for regular passenger traffic. As of late 2018, this traffic was predominantly weekday services.

References

Railway tunnels in the Republic of Ireland
Phoenix Park